Commissioned is an American urban contemporary gospel group from Detroit, Michigan. Members included Fred Hammond, Keith Staten, Marvin Sapp, Marcus Cole and Montrell Darrett.

The group recorded twelve albums over a period of seventeen years, and were nominated for Grammy and Stellar awards.

Group history 
The group originates from Detroit, Michigan. The six original members were Fred Hammond, Mitchell Jones, Keith Staten, Karl Reid, Michael Brooks and Michael Williams. The group formed in 1982, two years after Hammond played bass for The Winans. In 1990, Staten and Brooks left the group and were replaced with Marvin Sapp, Maxx Frank and Eddie Howard, Jr. By 1994, Howard had left the group, and Williams left a year later. Hammond also left to pursue a career with the choir Radical For Christ. He was replaced by Montrell Darrett. By 1999, Marcus Cole and Chris Poole had taken the place of Sapp, Frank and Darrett on the group's last studio album.

The R&B group Silk covered the Commissioned ballad "Cry On" on the movie soundtrack for Blankman (1994).

In 2002, Commissioned released a reunion album, which was recorded live at the Straightgate Church in Detroit, Michigan on October 26, 2001. Most of the group's former members reunited, and featured most of its greatest hits.

The group performed live on stage during the 2002 Stellar Awards in Atlanta, Georgia.

In 2011, they were honored at the BMI Awards after the Stellar Awards. Gospel artists sang musical tributes, including: Dawkins & Dawkins, Deitrick Haddon, Marvin Sapp, The Soul Seekers, The Clark Sisters and Men of Standard. The members who were present at the event were Hammond, Staten, Sapp, Jones, Reid, Williams, Frank, Darrett, Cole and Brooks. The group sang "Victory" from their sophomore record, Go Tell Somebody.

Hammond, Brooks, Staten, Sapp, Reid, Jones and Williams performed another reunion concert in 2019. It was hosted by the Pentecostal Assemblies of the World Incorporated. The group was invited to perform to celebrate the 104th Summer Convention of the P.A.W. Inc.

Discography

Albums

Compilations

Singles

Guest appearances

Performance videos

Billboard chart history

Albums

Awards

Nominations

Members
 Fred Hammond: lead vocals, background vocals, bass guitar (1982-1994, 2001–2002, 2011, 2013, 2018–present)
 Keith Staten: lead vocals, background vocals (1982-1990, 2001–2002, 2011, 2013, 2017–present)
 Mitchell Jones: lead vocals, background vocals (1982-2002, 2011, 2013, 2017-present)
 Karl Reid: lead vocals, background vocals (1982-2002, 2011, 2013, 2017-present)
 Eddie Howard, Jr: keyboards (1990-1994)
 Marvin Sapp: lead vocals, background vocals (1990-1996, 2001–2002, 2011, 2013, 2018–present)
 Michael Williams: drums (1982-1994, 2001–2002, 2011, 2018-present)
 Marcus Cole: lead vocals, background vocals (1996-2002, 2013, 2017–2019, 2022-present)
 Michael Brooks: keyboards (1982-1990, 2018–present)
 Montrell Darrett: lead vocals, background vocals (1995-1996)
 Chris Poole (1999-2000) (deceased)
 Maxx Frank: keyboards, B3 organ, mixing (1990-1996)

Footnotes

American gospel musical groups
Musical groups from Detroit
Musical groups established in 1984
Musical groups disestablished in 2011
1984 establishments in Michigan
2011 disestablishments in the United States
African-American musical groups